William Chapel Rogers III (born December 13, 1938) is a former officer in the United States Navy, most notable as the captain of , a  Aegis cruiser. While under his command, the ship shot down Iran Air Flight 655 in the Persian Gulf, killing 290 civilians and creating an international incident.

Early life and career prior to 1988
Rogers was born in Fort Worth, Texas, and grew up in San Antonio, Texas. His father, William C. Rogers II, was a United States Navy psychologist during World War II. He has a younger brother named Dick, who was paralyzed in an automobile accident, leaving him in a wheelchair. Rogers majored in psychology at Baylor University and earned a master's degree in history from Trinity University in San Antonio. He taught high school science for two years before entering Officer Candidate School.

Rogers was commissioned December 1965 and his first tour of duty was in the engineering department aboard the aircraft carrier, . After attending Armed Forces Staff College in Norfolk, Virginia Rogers worked with three admirals in Washington D.C. and was assigned to the Weapons Systems Evaluation Group under the Secretary of Defense. This duty involved a series of trips to Israel in the wake of the 1973 Yom Kippur War. He would later command , another Spruance-class destroyer, from September 1981 to August 1984. Prior to his command of  he served in the Pentagon as the head of a section in the Planning Division of Chief of Naval Operations.

Captain Rogers married Sharon (Loomis) Rogers, in Fort Worth, Texas on July 12, 1964. They had one son born February 1969 named Will C. Rogers IV who is known as Bill.

Commanding USS Vincennes

Rogers was the second commanding officer of Vincennes and assumed command April 11, 1987. At the time, Vincennes was one of only five cruisers commissioned that carried the new Aegis combat system, a billion-dollar computerized integrated battle management system and the first such cruiser to join the Pacific fleet. The heart of Aegis is an advanced, automatic detect-and-track, multi-function three-dimensional phased array radar, the AN/SPY-1. Command of an Aegis cruiser was considered to be very prestigious at the time. On April 25, 1988, Vincennes was deployed on a six-month cruise in support of Operation Earnest Will, the reflagging and escort of oil tankers in the Persian Gulf.

Iran Air 655

On July 3, 1988, Vincennes shot down Iran Air Flight 655 with two radar guided SM-2MR missiles. All 290 on-board including 16 crew perished. At the time of the incident, Vincennes was inside Iranian territorial waters and engaged in small arms combat with several Iranian surface craft, and Vincennes received a report that one of its LAMPS III Seahawk helicopters had drawn warning fire during flight operations.

A subsequent US report by Rear Admiral William Fogarty, titled Formal Investigation into the Circumstances Surrounding the Downing of Iran Air Flight 655 on July 3, 1988, noted that Captain Rogers received some faulty information that he subsequently used to make the decision to fire on the plane. Specifically, he was told the aircraft was identified as an Iranian Air Force F-14 Tomcat descending in an attack profile, and that it was identifying itself with secondary surveillance radar / IFF mode-II codes exclusively used by military aircraft. The investigation noted that Rogers was focused on the ongoing surface engagement and was aware of the inbound aircraft for less than four minutes. The investigation also pointed out that Rogers thought that he had an increased burden to act since he was also assigned to protect the frigate . The investigation concluded that Rogers acted in a prudent manner based on the information available to him, and the short time frame involved. He was also judged to have acted within the prescribed rules of engagement for USN warship captains in that situation.

Independent investigations into the incident have presented a different picture. John Barry and Roger Charles of Newsweek magazine claimed that Rogers was overeager for combat, that he started the fight with Iranian gunboats, and then followed them into Iranian territorial waters. Barry and Charles also accused the U.S. government of a cover-up.

Other sources lay some of the blame on the complexity of the AEGIS technology and the desire on the part of Captain Rogers to make use of it. An analysis of the events by the International Strategic Studies Association described the deployment of an Aegis cruiser into that zone as irresponsible, and the Association thought that the enormous cost of his warship had played a major part in setting a low threshold for Captain Rogers decision to open fire.

In 2004, Marita Turpin and Niek du Plooy of the Centre for Logistics and Decision Support partially attributed the accident to an expectancy bias introduced by the Aegis Combat System and faulted the design and "unhelpful user interface" as contributing to the errors of judgment.

Carlson described the downing of the airliner as the "horrifying climax to Capt. Rogers' aggressiveness, first seen four weeks ago". He was referring to incidents on June 2, 1988, when he claimed that Rogers brought Vincennes too close to an Iranian frigate that was searching a bulk carrier, that he launched a helicopter too close to Iranian small boats, and that he fired upon a number of small Iranian military boats instead of directing another, smaller warship to do so. In disagreeing with Rogers' decision – citing the high cost of the cruiser relative to that of the frigates attached to the group – Carlson posited, "Why do you want an AEGIS cruiser out there shooting up boats? It wasn't a smart thing to do."

USS Vincennes, with Rogers remaining in command, completed the remainder of her scheduled deployment to the Pacific and Indian Oceans. During the voyage home on September 22, 1988, Vincennes rescued 26 Vietnamese boat people adrift in the South China Sea.  The ship returned to Naval Station San Diego on October 25, 1988.

Rogers remained in command of USS Vincennes until May 27, 1989. In 1990, Captain Rogers was awarded the Legion of Merit decoration "for exceptionally meritorious conduct in the performance of outstanding service as commanding officer ... from April 1987 to May 1989." The award was given for his service as the Commanding Officer of Vincennes, and the citation made no mention of the downing of Iran Air 655.

Bombing of Rogers' family minivan
Nine months after the downing of Iran Air Flight 655, on the morning of March 10, 1989, Rogers' wife Sharon escaped uninjured when a pipe bomb exploded and set fire to her minivan as she sat stopped at a red light across the street from the University Towne Center shopping mall in San Diego. The van was registered in the name of Will Rogers III, and many people at the time of the bombing suspected that terrorism was involved. Five months later, the Associated Press reported that the Federal Bureau of Investigation (FBI) had shifted focus away from terrorism towards the possibility of someone with a personal vendetta against Captain Rogers. As of 2003, the bombing of Rogers' van remains an unsolved case, despite a major investigation involving at some time up to 300 police and FBI agents. On February 17, 1993, the case was featured on the TV show Unsolved Mysteries, but no additional information was uncovered.

Naval career following Vincennes
Rogers' next assignment was as commanding officer of the United States Navy Tactical Training Group at Naval Base Point Loma, a group responsible for training officers in handling combat situations. He retired from the United States Navy in August 1991. In 1992, Rogers and his wife Sharon co-wrote a book, Storm Center: A Personal Account of Tragedy & Terrorism which describes the events surrounding the downing of Iran Air 655 and the minivan bombing from their personal perspectives.

References

External links
 Formal Investigation into the Circumstances Surrounding the Downing of Iran Air Flight 655 on July 3, 1988. Official DOD PDF link, without critique
 Aerial Incident of July 3, 1988 (Islamic Republic of Iran v. United States of America), PDF, International Court of Justice

1938 births
Living people
People from Fort Worth, Texas
People from San Diego
United States Navy captains

Recipients of the Legion of Merit
Recipients of the Gallantry Cross (Vietnam)
Military personnel from California
Military personnel from Texas